This article describes the qualification for the 2018 European Men's Handball Championship.

Qualification system
38 teams had registered for participation. 37 teams competed for 15 places at the final tournament in 2 distinct Qualification Phases. In each phase, the teams were divided into several pots according to their positions in the EHF National Team Ranking.

Qualification Phase 1

Seeding
The draw for the qualification round was held on 22 July 2014 in Vienna, Austria.
The group winners advanced to the playoffs.

All times are local.

Group 1

Group 2

Group 3

Playoffs
The draw for the playoffs was held on 23 June 2015 in Vienna, Austria. The winners advanced to the second phase.

|}

All times are local.

Matches

Finland won 55–52 on aggregate.

Romania won 62–48 on aggregate.

Belgium won 66–50 on aggregate.

Qualification Phase 2
The draw was held on 14 April 2016 in Dubrovnik. The teams were split into seven groups of four teams. The top two ranked teams from each group and the best third ranked team qualified for the final tournament.

All times are local.

Group 1

Group 2

Group 3

Group 4

Group 5

Group 6

Group 7

Ranking of third-placed teams
The highest ranked third-placed team from the groups directly qualifies for the tournament. Matches against the fourth placed teams in each group are discarded.

References

External links
Eurohandball Site

Qualification
Europe Men's Championship qualification
Europe Men's Championship qualification
Europe Men's Championship qualification
Europe Men's Championship qualification
Qualification for handball competitions